Yelandy Contreras Vásquez (born 25 February 1997) is a Dominican footballer who plays as a goalkeeper. She has been a member of the Dominican Republic women's national team.

Early life
Contreras hails from Bayaguana.

International career
Contreras capped for the Dominican Republic at senior level during the 2014 Central American and Caribbean Games.

References 

1997 births
Living people
People from Monte Plata Province
Dominican Republic women's footballers
Women's association football goalkeepers
Dominican Republic women's international footballers
Competitors at the 2014 Central American and Caribbean Games